The Seychelles bronze gecko (Ailuronyx seychellensis) is a species of lizard in the family Gekkonidae endemic to Seychelles.

Its natural habitats are subtropical or tropical dry forests, subtropical or tropical moist lowland forests, plantations, rural gardens, and heavily degraded former forests.
It is threatened by habitat loss.

References

Fauna of Seychelles
Ailuronyx
Endemic fauna of Seychelles
Reptiles described in 1834
Taxa named by André Marie Constant Duméril
Taxonomy articles created by Polbot